Vabank is a 1981 Polish comedy heist film written and directed by Juliusz Machulski, set in 1934 Warsaw (although actually filmed  in Łódź and Piotrków Trybunalski).

The film received several awards and nominations, among them:
 Polish Film Festival 1981 – Best Debut Director
 Mystfest 1982 – Best Film

The film's name is Polish for Va banque, a gambling term for when one is betting to win or lose all.

Plot
In October 1934, a famous safe cracker in Warsaw criminal circles and also a jazz trumpeter, Henryk Kwinto, is released from a prison, where he has spent the past six years. After arriving home, he discovers that his wife has already found a substitute for him in the face of a police commissioner named Karelicki. Kwinto removes hidden roll of banknotes out of the chair's leg, places his key to the apartment on a table and leaves.

Near the city gates he is met by two younger petty criminals, brothers Moks and Nuta who have successfully debuted by robbing a jewel store and are now wishing to have the legendary safe-cracker as an accomplice. Kwinto by taking out of his pocket a mouthpiece of trumpet asserts that they had mistaken him for someone else and he is a musician. Although they seem to be confused, the brothers nonetheless tell him the address of their automobile shop in case if "Mr Musician would be willing to play together with them".

Kwinto rents a hotel room. Soon he is visited by his former accomplice and now a successful banker, Gustaw Kramer who informs him that six years ago Kwinto was arrested not by chance. Kramer who was caught in the act, then agreed to lure the elusive safe-cracker into a trap set up by the police. As a compensation for moral damages he brought Kwinto 45,000 złoty considering his betrayal as resolved. In response Kwinto advises not to tell him the address of his bank, to which Kramer is confident in the invulnerability of the bank's own safes reacts with a sneer and uses the phrase "ear of a herring" (an idiom, similar to English "Goose egg") hinting at the impossibility of robbing his bank.

Kwinto goes to visit a musician named Tadeusz Rychliński,  with whom he performed in a band at least six years earlier. From the wife of Tadeusz, Marta, he learns about the death of his friend. Shortly before his death, Tadeusz deposited all his savings, 19,000 złoty, in the bank of Kramer, but on the way home he was robbed, the raiders took away the receipt and the bank deposit became unavailable. The next day Tadeusz allegedly threw himself out of the window. According to the widow, the police arrived to conclusion that there was a suicide.

In the memory of a perished friend, Marta gives Kwinto the Tadeusz's trumpet. In its mouthpiece Kwinto discovers a note of Rychliński where it says "I know how Kramer became an owner of the bank". Kwinto arrives to conclusion that robbery and staging of the suicide were committed at the Kramer's request.

In the light of the discovered circumstances Kwinto starts to act. He finds Moks and Nuta in their automobile shop and instructs them to find the last address of his old friend Duńczyk. Kramer receives back his 45,000 złoty in mail along with a newspaper cut out where placed the Tadeusz's obituary and understands that a war is declared on him. He sends to Kwinto Krempitsch, a hired killer, who sometime ago killed Tadeusz by pushing him out of a window. But Kwinto, who foresaw the action of the banker, takes care of Krempitsch by himself.

The brothers have not found Duńczyk. The search has been taken over by Kwinto himself and, remembering his old habits, finds his pal at a football game. However, Duńczyk has finished with his criminal past and more than anything he values a peace. At first he refuses, but Henryk convinces Duńczyk that for him taking vengeance on Kramer is a matter of principle. They witnessed that Krempitsch, trying to kill Kwinto, accidentally kills a complete stranger. Taking the advantage of a muss, heroes leave the stadium. After all Duńczyk agrees to participate in his friend's daring plan.

Kwinto presents his plan to rob the Kramer's bank and that under suspicion turned to be the banker himself. Duńczyk heads on reconnaissance to the bank and opens to be obvious an account there. With experience eye, he assesses all alarm features of the bank's building and in his home workshop by method of trial and error selects the shape of the plate capable of blocking the alarm.

The companions begin to implement the plan. Kramer on accident as he thinks meets with a charming Natalia whom he helps to start the stalled car. A week later with bouquet of flowers and champagne Kramer comes to visit her. On one of stair landings he runs into a black man who exists a neighboring apartment with a Dalmatian on the leash. Natalia asks Kramer to help her unfasten the necklace with the plate that is supposed to block the alarm in the bank and insensibly throws the adornment into the window where it is picked by Moks.

At the same time Kwinto under suspicion of robbing the lawyer Walenta's villa is detained by police and brought to the precinct. However soon the real robbers are arrested and Kwinto is getting released.

Downing gas masks and gloves, Kwinto and his companions infiltrate into the bank through a ventilation shaft of the restaurant located over it. There they stun security guards, block the alarm with a plate that served as the necklace clasp, and take out of the safe all money and valued papers. With a thermal lance Nuta cuts through a side wall of the safe an opening, and the group goes away leaving at the crime scene a plate of the necklace. Taking advantage of the owner's absence, the accomplices transport the main portion of the valuables to the Kramer's house.

In the evening celebrating the successfully turned trick the group to which belongs Natalia as well being a fiancée of Moks divides the remaining money. His share Kwinto sends to Marta ostensibly as compensation to the family of the victim of bank's machinations.

In the morning the bank was filled with police. Head of the investigation commissioner Przygoda determines that the safe was cut only to stage hacking, and rather was opened in the usual way. In addition on the found plate were discovered fingerprints of Kramer. It gave the commissioner a reason to conduct the search in the Kramer's house where in basket with dirty laundry were found the stolen valuables.

Kramer attempts to prove that at the time of robbery he has an alibi. At first he takes police to the Natalia's apartment, but she is not there and living in the apartment people argue that never saw Kramer. Then the banker remembers about another witness, a black man with a Dalmatian who had exited out of the neighboring apartment. But the owner of the apartment claims that never saw them.

Kramer gets arrested. Near the court's building he sees Kwinto who reads a newspaper and understands the robbery of his bank is the handiwork of a former accomplice. Kwinto catching the Kramer's glance touches his ear reminding Kramer about his words "ear from a herring".

A sequel, Vabank II, was made in 1984.

Cast 
 Jan Machulski – Henryk Kwinto, a former safecracker
 Leonard Pietraszak – Gustaw Kramer, a former accomplice of Kwinto, today a successful banker
 Witold Pyrkosz – Duńczyk, a friend and an accomplice of Kwinto
 Jacek Chmielnik – Moks, a petty rascal
 Krzysztof Kiersznowski – Nuta, a brother and an accomplice of Moks
 Elżbieta Zającówna – Natalia, a Moks' fiancée
 Marek Walczewski – Twerdiewicz, a prison warden
 Tadeusz Proc – Tadeusz Rychliński
 Ewa Szykulska – Marta Rychlińska, a widow of Tadeusz Rychliński
 Zdzisław Kuźniar – Krempitsch, a professional killer
 Józef Para – commissioner Przygoda, a police officer
 Zbigniew Geiger – Stawiski, a secretary of Kramer
 Zofia Grąziewicz – a wife of Kwinto
 Janusz Michałowski – commissioner Karelicki, a police officer and a lover of Kwinto's wife
 Ryszard Kotys – Melski
 Henryk Bista – Jan Rożek

References

External links 
 

1981 films
1980s Polish-language films
1980s crime comedy films
1980s heist films
Films about bank robbery
Films about con artists
Films about revenge
Films directed by Juliusz Machulski
Films set in 1934
Films set in Warsaw
Films about fraud
Polish crime comedy films
1981 directorial debut films
1981 comedy films